Adders on the Heath is a 1963 mystery detective novel by the British writer Gladys Mitchell. It is the thirty sixth in the long-running series of books featuring Mitchell's best known character, the psychoanalyst and amateur detective Mrs Bradley.

Synopsis
The fierce rivalry between two running clubs appears to have ended in murder, until Dame Beatrice Bradley is able to demonstrate the real reason for the death.

References

Bibliography
 Reilly, John M. Twentieth Century Crime & Mystery Writers. Springer, 2015.

1963 British novels
Novels by Gladys Mitchell
British crime novels
British mystery novels
British thriller novels
Novels set in England
British detective novels
Michael Joseph books